Thomas Forbes Kelsall (1799 – September 1872), was an English lawyer and literary figure. For some time he lived at 3 Houndwell Lane, Southampton.
He married Frances Anne Harrison on 21 April 1829.

T. F. Kelsall was the literary executor and friend of Thomas Lovell Beddoes, and edited some of his published work, including the notable Death's Jest Book: or, The Fool's Tragedy, in 1850.  He wrote the obituary of Beddoes that appeared in the Fortnightly Review, vol. 18, p. 75.

Books published
Beddoes, T. L. Death's Jest Book: or, The Fool's Tragedy, 1850
Beddoes, T. L. Poems of the late Thomas Lovell Beddoes, 1851
Beddoes, T. L. Poems, Posthumous and Collected, 1851

See also
Thomas Lovell Beddoes Society website

References
"The Anatomy of Revolution: Beddoes and Buchner" by Frederick Burwick Pacific Coast Philology, Vol. 6, Apr., 1971 (Apr., 1971), pp. 5–12
Lytton Strachey, Books and Characters art. on Beddoes. 
Dictionary of National Biography, (article on Beddoes)  1911. v. 4, p. 91 
birth and death dates of T F Kelsall

1799 births
1872 deaths